mouse on the keys is a Japanese post-rock band from Tokyo.

History
mouse on the keys began in 2007 with the release of an EP titled Sezession. 

In 2009, mouse on the keys released their first full-length album titled An Anxious Object on "Machu Picchu Industries".

In 2011, mouse on the keys released DVD of the documentation of their tour in Europe Irreversible. It directed by Minoru Kubota.

In 2012, the band released an EP titled Machinic Phylum on "Machu Picchu Industries". 

In 2015, the band released their second full-length album titled The Flowers of Romance on "Mule Musiq". 

In 2016, the band released a split with Japanese math rock band Lite on "Topshelf Records". mouse on the Keys released a live album titled Live at Red Bull Studios Tokyo. 

In 2017, mouse on the keys released an EP on "Topshelf Records" titled Out Of Body. mouse on the keys composed music for the exhibition "TADAO ANDO : ENDEAVORS” at the National Art Center, Tokyo. The new music written for the installation is entitled The Beginnings / The Prophecy (TADAO ANDO : ENDEAVORS version).

mouse on the keys released their third studio album titled Tres on "Topshelf Records" in 2018. 

In 2019, mouse on the keys released new single Circle on February and this track was recorded with guest musicians; Masahiro Tobita (guitar) and Yuri Kamo (guitar). Also the band released another single mind on August. Both tracks are released from their label fractrec.

Yuji Katsui (from ROVO) x mouse on the keys released the soundtrack album of NHK Special Drama ''Phone Fraud Children'' on October 2.

In 2020, mouse on the keys released new EP titled Arche on  "felicity / fractrec" and "Topshelf Records".

In 2021, mouse on the keys revealed that member Atsushi Kiyota (keys) will be leaving the group. The other two members, Akira Kawasaki (drums) and Daisuke Niitome (keys) will continue to play as mouse on the keys, and are planning to add a new member. Atsushi Kiyota will be playing music individually.

In 2022, mouse on the keys announced Takumi Shiroeda (Piano, Keyboards) as the new member of the band. The band did the first live concert in three years at Hiratsuka Hall in Japan and they released limited new single CD titled "The Dawn".

Band members
Akira Kawasaki (drums)
Daisuke Niitome (keyboards)
Takumi Shiroeda (Piano, Keyboards)
Past Members

 Atsushi Kiyota (keyboards)

Discography

Studio albums
An Anxious Object (2009, Machu Picchu Industries)
The Flowers of Romance (2015, Mule Musiq)
Tres (2018, Topshelf)

EPs
Sezession (2007, Machu Picchu Industries)
Machinic Phylum (2012, Machu Picchu Industries)
Out of Body (2017, Topshelf)
Circle (2019, fractrec)
Arche (2020, Topshelf Records / felicity / fractrec)

Singles
"The Beginnings" / "The Prophecy" - Digital (2017, fractrec)
"Stars Down" - Digital / 7inch (2018, fractrec)
"Circle" - Digital (2019, fractrec)
"Mind" - Digital (2019, fractrec)
"The Dawn" - Limited CD (2022, fractrec)

Splits
 Kowloon / Mouse On The Keys (2010)
 LITE / mouse on the keys Split (2016, Topshelf Records)

Live albums
 mouse on the keys and aku Live Session 2011/3/28 (2011)
Live at the Red Bull Studios Tokyo (2016, self-released)

DVDs
 Irreversible (2011, Machu Picchu Industries)

Soundtracks
 Yuji Katsui x mouse on the keys NHK Special Drama ''Phone Fraud Children'' Original Soundtrack (2019, SPACE SHOWER MUSIC)

References

Japanese post-rock groups
Musical groups from Tokyo
Topshelf Records artists